Scopula polystigmaria is a moth of the  family Geometridae. It is found in Kashmir.

References

Moths described in 1903
polystigmaria
Moths of Asia